Carlos Felipe Uriarte (born December 10, 1979) is an American attorney who is the assistant attorney general for legislative affairs.

Early life and education 
Uriarte was born on December 10, 1979 in San Leandro, California. He earned a Bachelor of Arts degree in American culture studies from the Washington University in St. Louis in 2002 and a Juris Doctor from the University of Pennsylvania Law School in 2005.

Career 
Uriarte worked as a summer associate at Heller Ehrman and Akin Gump Strauss Hauer & Feld. In 2006 and 2007, Uriarte served as a law clerk for Judge Juan Ramon Sánchez. From 2007 to 2009, he worked as a white collar and antitrust associate at Crowell & Moring. He then served as legislative counsel to Congresswoman Judy Chu and counsel to the United States House Committee on Oversight and Reform. In 2013 and 2014, he served as senior counsel to the secretary of the United States Department of the Interior. From 2014 to 2017, he served as associate deputy attorney general in the Office of the Deputy Attorney General. After the end of the Obama administration, Uriarte worked as a vice president at Capital One. In 2020 and 2021, he served as chief counsel for the United States House Select Oversight Subcommittee on the Coronavirus Crisis. Since April 2021, he has worked as vice president and regulator counsel for Unite Us, a technology company.

Biden administration
On May 3, 2022, President Joe Biden nominated Uriarte to be an assistant attorney general for legislative affairs. Hearings were held before the Senate Judiciary Committee on June 22, 2022. His nomination was favorably reported on July 21, 2022. He was confirmed via voice vote on August 4, 2022.

Affiliations 
Uriarte is a member of the following bar associations:
State Bar of California (2005–present)
District of Columbia Bar (2006–present)
American Bar Association
Hispanic National Bar Association
Hispanic Bar Association of DC
National LGBTQ+ Bar Association

References 

1979 births
Living people
Biden administration personnel
American gay men
Hispanic and Latino American lawyers
LGBT lawyers
LGBT people from California
Obama administration personnel
People from San Leandro, California
United States Department of the Interior officials
United States Department of Justice lawyers
United States Department of Justice officials
University of Pennsylvania Law School alumni
Washington University in St. Louis alumni